A Successful Adventure is a lost 1918 silent film romantic comedy starring May Allison and Harry Hilliard. It was produced by Maxwell Karger and released through Metro Pictures.

An alternative title was The Way to a Man's Heart.

Cast
May Allison - Virginia Houston
Harry Hilliard - Perry Arnold
Frank Currier - Lionel Houston
Edward Connelly - Daniel Houston
Christine Mayo - Rose Mason
Fred C. Jones - Henry Du Bois
Kate Blancke - Aunt Louise
Pauline Dempsey - Aunt Judy
Anthony Byrd - Uncle Joshua
Phoebe Starr
Maurice Steuart
Howard Oppenheim
Lionel Houston
Dion Muse

References

External links

1918 films
American silent feature films
Lost American films
1918 romantic comedy films
American black-and-white films
American romantic comedy films
1918 lost films
Lost romantic comedy films
1910s American films
Silent romantic comedy films
Silent American comedy films